Ed Richards may refer to:

 Ed Richards (chief executive) (born 1965/6), chief executive of Ofcom
 Ed Richards (fencer) (1929–2012), American Olympic fencer
 Ed Richards (footballer) (born 1999), Australian footballer

See also
Edward Richards (disambiguation)